Internal gangrene is a general term for necrosis of an internal organ, such as the large intestine, appendix, or small intestine. It may refer to:

 Ischemic colitis, large intestine
 Mesenteric ischemia, small intestine

See also
 Gangrene (disambiguation)